Gender-affirming surgery (GAS) is a surgical procedure, or series of procedures, that alters a transgender or transsexual person's physical appearance and sexual characteristics to resemble those associated with their identified gender, and alleviate gender dysphoria. It is also known as sex reassignment surgery (SRS), gender confirmation surgery (GCS), and several other names. 

Professional medical organizations have established Standards of Care, which apply before someone can apply for and receive reassignment surgery, including psychological evaluation, and a period of real-life experience living in the desired gender.

Feminization surgeries are surgeries that result in anatomy that is typically gendered female, such as vaginoplasty and breast augmentation, whereas masculinization surgeries are those that result in anatomy that is typically gendered male, such as phalloplasty and breast reduction.

In addition to GAS, patients may need to follow a lifelong course of masculinizing or feminizing hormone replacement therapy.

Sweden became the first country in the world to allow transgender people to change their legal gender after "reassignment surgery" and provide free "reassignment" treatment in 1972. Singapore followed soon after in 1973, being the first in Asia.

Terminology 
Gender-affirming surgery (GAS) is known by numerous other names, including gender-affirmation surgery (GAS), sex reassignment surgery (SRS), gender reassignment surgery (GRS), and gender confirmation surgery (GCS). Top surgery and bottom surgery refer to surgeries on the chest and genitals respectively. It is sometimes called a sex change, though this term is usually considered offensive.

Some transgender people who desire medical assistance to transition from one sex to another identify as "transsexual".

Trans women and others assigned male at birth may undergo one or more feminizing procedures which result in anatomy that is typically gendered female. These include genital surgeries such as penectomy (removal of the penis), orchiectomy (removal of the testes), vaginoplasty (construction of a vagina), as well as breast augmentation, tracheal shave (reduction of the Adam's apple), facial feminization surgery, and voice feminization surgery among others.

Trans men and others assigned female at birth seeking surgery may undergo one or more masculinizing procedures, which include chest reconstruction, breast reduction, hysterectomy (removal of the uterus), oophorectomy (removal of the ovaries). A penis can be constructed through metoidioplasty or phalloplasty, and a scrotum through scrotoplasty.

Surgical procedures

Genital surgery 

The array of medically indicated surgeries differs between trans women (male to female) and trans men (female to male). For trans women, genital reconstruction usually involves the surgical construction of a vagina, by means of penile inversion or the sigmoid colon neovagina technique; or, more recently, non-penile inversion techniques that make use of scrotal tissue to construct the vaginal canal. For trans men, genital reconstruction may involve construction of a penis through either phalloplasty or metoidioplasty. For both trans women and trans men, genital surgery may also involve other medically necessary ancillary procedures, such as orchiectomy, penectomy, mastectomy or vaginectomy. Complications of penile inversion vaginoplasty are mostly minor; however, rectoneovaginal fistulas (abnormal connections between the neovagina and the rectum) can occur in about 1–3% of patients. These require additional surgery to correct and are often fixed by colorectal surgeons.

Other surgeries 

As underscored by WPATH, a medically assisted transition from one gender to another may entail any of a variety of non-genital surgical procedures which change primary and/or secondary sex characteristics, any of which are considered "gender-affirming surgery" when undertaken to affirm a person's gender identity. For trans men, these may include mastectomy (removal of the breasts) and chest reconstruction (the shaping of a male-contoured chest), or hysterectomy and bilateral salpingo-oophorectomy (removal of ovaries and Fallopian tubes). For some trans women, facial feminization surgery, hair implants, and breast augmentation are also aesthetic components of their surgical treatment.

Scope and procedures 

The best known of these surgeries are those that reshape the genitals, which are also known as genital reassignment surgery or genital reconstruction surgery (GRS)- or bottom surgery (the latter is named in contrast to top surgery, which is surgery to the breasts; bottom surgery does not refer to surgery on the buttocks in this context). However, the meaning of "sex reassignment surgery" has been clarified by the medical subspecialty organization, the World Professional Association for Transgender Health (WPATH), to include any of a larger number of surgical procedures performed as part of a medical treatment for "gender dysphoria" or "transsexualism". According to WPATH, medically necessary sex reassignment surgeries include "complete hysterectomy, bilateral mastectomy, chest reconstruction or augmentation ... including breast prostheses if necessary, genital reconstruction (by various techniques which must be appropriate to each patient ...)... and certain facial plastic reconstruction." In addition, other non-surgical procedures are also considered medically necessary treatments by WPATH, including facial hair electrolysis.

Voice feminizing surgery is a procedure in which the overall pitch range of the patients voice is reduced.

Adam's Apple Reduction surgery (chondrolaryngoplasty) or tracheal shaving is a procedure in which the most prominent part of the thyroid cartilage is reduced.

There is also Adam's Apple Enhancement therapy, in which cartilage is used to bring out the Adam's apple in female to male patients.

History 

Reports of people seeking gender-confirming surgery (vaginoplasty) go back to the 2nd century. The first modern gender-confirming surgery was performed in the 20th century.

20th century 
In the US in 1917, Alan L. Hart, an American tuberculosis specialist, became one of the first trans men to undergo hysterectomy and gonadectomy as treatment of what is now called gender dysphoria.

Dora Richter is the first known trans woman to undergo complete male-to-female genital surgery. She was one of several transgender people in the care of sexologist Magnus Hirschfeld at Berlin's Institute for Sexual Research. In 1922, Richter underwent orchiectomy. In early 1931, a penectomy, followed in June by vaginoplasty. Richter is presumed to have died in May 1933, when Nazis attacked the institute and destroyed its records, but her exact fate is not known.

Between 1930 and 1931, Lili Elbe underwent four sex reassignment surgeries, including orchiectomy, an ovarian transplant, and penectomy. In June 1931, she underwent her fourth surgery, including an experimental uterine transplant and vaginoplasty, which she hoped would allow her to give birth. However, her body rejected the transplanted uterus, and she died of post-operative complications in September, at age 48.

A previous SRS patient was Magnus Hirschfeld's housekeeper, but their name has not been discovered.

Elmer Belt may have been the first U.S. surgeon to perform gender affirmation surgery, in about 1950.

In 1951, Harold Gillies, a plastic surgeon active in World War II, worked to develop the first technique for female-to-male SRS, producing a technique that has become a modern standard, called phalloplasty. Phalloplasty is a cosmetic procedure that produces a visual penis out of grafted tissue from the patient.

Following phalloplasty, in 1999, the procedure for metoidioplasty was developed for female-to-male surgical transition by the doctors Lebovic and Laub. Considered a variant of phalloplasty, metoidioplasty works to create a penis out of the patient's present clitoris. This allows the patient to have a sensation-perceiving penis head. Metoidioplasty may be used in conjunction with phalloplasty to produce a larger, more "cis-appearing" penis in multiple stages.

21st century 
On 12 June 2003, the European Court of Human Rights ruled in favor of Carola van Kück, a German trans woman whose insurance company denied her reimbursement for sex reassignment surgery as well as hormone replacement therapy. The legal arguments related to the Article 6 of the European Convention on Human Rights as well as the Article 8. This affair is referred to as van Kück vs Germany.

In 2011, Christiane Völling won the first successful case brought by an intersex person against a surgeon for non-consensual surgical intervention described by the International Commission of Jurists as "an example of an individual who was subjected to sex reassignment surgery without full knowledge or consent".

 some European countries require forced sterilization for the legal recognition of sex reassignment. , Japan also requires an individual to undergo sterilization to change their legal sex.

The early history of sex reassignment surgery in transgender people has been reviewed by various authors.

Prevalence 
The prevalence of transgender-related surgeries is difficult to measure and likely underestimated. In 2015, the largest survey of transgender people in the United States reported that 25% of respondents reported having undergone such a surgery.

Prior to surgery

Medical considerations 
Some transgender persons present with health conditions including diabetes, asthma, and HIV, which can lead to complications with future therapy and pharmacological management. Typical SRS procedures involve complex medication regimens, including sex hormone therapy, throughout and after surgery. Typically, a patient's treatment involves a healthcare team consisting of a variety of providers including endocrinologists, whom the surgeon may consult when determining if the patient is physically fit for surgery. Health providers including pharmacists can play a role in maintaining safe and cost-effective regimens, providing patient education, and addressing other health issues including smoking cessation and weight loss.

People with HIV or hepatitis C may have difficulty finding a surgeon able to perform successful surgery. Many surgeons operate in small private clinics that cannot treat potential complications in these populations. Some surgeons charge higher fees for HIV and hepatitis C-positive patients; other medical professionals assert that it is unethical to deny surgical or hormonal treatments to transgender people solely on the basis of their HIV or hepatitis status.

Fertility is also a factor considered in SRS, as patients are typically informed that if an orchiectomy or oöphoro-hysterectomy is performed, it might make them irreversibly infertile.

Gender dysphoric children 
Sex reassignment surgery is generally not performed on children under 18, though in rare cases may be performed on adolescents if health care providers agree there is an unusual benefit to doing so or risk to not performing it. Preferred treatments for children include puberty blockers, which are thought to have some reversible physical changes, and sex hormones, which reduce the need for future surgery. Medical protocols typically require long-term mental health counseling to verify persistent and genuine gender dysphoria before any intervention, and consent of a parent or guardian or court order is legally required in most jurisdictions.

Intersex children and cases of trauma 

Infants born with intersex conditions might undergo interventions at or close to birth. This is controversial because of the human rights implications.

There can be negative outcomes (including PTSD and suicide) can occur when the surgically assigned gender does not match the individual's gender identity, which will only be realized by the individual later in life. Milton Diamond at the John A. Burns School of Medicine, University of Hawaii recommended that physicians do not perform surgery on children until they are old enough to give informed consent and to assign such infants in the gender to which they will probably best adjust. Diamond believed introducing children to others with differences of sex development could help remove shame and stigma. Diamond considered the intersex condition as a difference of sex development, not as a disorder.

Standards of care 

Sex reassignment surgery can be difficult to obtain due to financial barriers, insurance coverage, and lack of providers. An increasing number of surgeons are now training to perform such surgeries. In many regions, an individual's pursuit of SRS is often governed, or at least guided, by documents called Standards of Care for the Health of Transgender and Gender Diverse People (SOC). The most widespread SOC in this field is published and frequently revised by the World Professional Association for Transgender Health (WPATH, formerly the Harry Benjamin International Gender Dysphoria Association or HBIGDA). Many jurisdictions and medical boards in the United States and other countries recognize the WPATH Standards of Care for the treatment of transgender individuals. Some treatment may require a minimum duration of psychological evaluation and living as a member of the target gender full-time, sometimes called the real life experience (RLE) (sometimes mistakenly referred to as the real life test (RLT)) before sex reassignment surgeries are covered by insurance.

Standards of Care usually give certain very specific "minimum" requirements as guidelines for progressing with treatment, causing them to be highly controversial and often maligned documents among transgender patients seeking surgery. Alternative local standards of care exist, such as in the Netherlands, Germany, and Italy. Much of the criticism surrounding the WPATH/HBIGDA-SOC applies to these as well, and some of these SOCs (mostly European SOC) are actually based on much older versions of the WPATH SOC. Other SOCs are entirely independent of the WPATH. The criteria of many of those SOCs are stricter than the latest revision of the WPATH-SOC. Many qualified surgeons in North America and many in Europe adhere almost unswervingly to the WPATH SOC or other SOCs. However, in the United States many experienced surgeons are able to apply the WPATH SOC in ways which respond to an individual's medical circumstances, as is consistent with the SOC.

Many surgeons require two letters of recommendation for sex reassignment surgery. At least one of these letters must be from a mental health professional experienced in diagnosing gender identity disorder (now recognized as gender dysphoria), who has known the patient for over a year. Letters must state that sex reassignment surgery is the correct course of treatment for the patient.

Many medical professionals and numerous professional associations have stated that surgical interventions should not be required for transsexual individuals to change sex designation on identity documents. However, depending on the legal requirements of many jurisdictions, transsexual and transgender people are often unable to change the listing of their sex in public records unless they can furnish a physician's letter attesting that sex reassignment surgery has been performed. In some jurisdictions legal gender change is prohibited in any circumstances, even after genital or other surgery or treatment.

Insurance 

A growing number of public and commercial health insurance plans in the United States now contain defined benefits covering sex reassignment-related procedures, usually including genital reconstruction surgery (MTF and FTM), chest reconstruction (FTM), breast augmentation (MTF), and hysterectomy (FTM). For patients to qualify for insurance coverage, certain insurance plans may require proof of the following:
 a written initial assessment by a qualified licensed mental health professional
 persistent, well-documented gender dysphoria
 months of prior physician-supervised hormone therapy

In June 2008, the American Medical Association (AMA) House of Delegates stated that the denial to patients with gender dysphoria or otherwise covered benefits represents discrimination, and that the AMA supports "public and private health insurance coverage for treatment for gender dysphoria as recommended by the patient's physician." Other organizations have issued similar statements, including WPATH, the American Psychological Association, and the National Association of Social Workers.

In 2017, the United States Defense Health Agency for the first time approved payment for sex reassignment surgery for an active-duty U.S. military service member. The patient, an infantry soldier who is a transgender woman, had already begun a course of treatment for gender reassignment. The procedure, which the treating doctor deemed medically necessary, was performed on 14 November at a private hospital, since U.S. military hospitals lack the requisite surgical expertise.

Post-procedural considerations

Quality of life and physical health 
Several studies have measured quality of life and self-perceived physical health using different scales. Castellano et al. (2015) found similar quality of life compared to a control group for 60 SRS patients two years after surgery. Kuhn et al. (2008), assessing 52 trans women and 3 trans men 15 years after surgery, found quality of life lower than control in domains of health and limitations. De Cuypere et al. (2005), assessing 32 trans women and 23 trans men after surgery, concluded that patients' emotional and social needs were met, but less so their physical and sexual needs. Ainsworth and Spiegel (2010), in a study of 247 trans women, find improvements in mental health after genital reassignment surgery or face feminization surgery.

In 2021, a review published in Plastic And Reconstructive Surgery found that less than 1% of people who undergo gender-affirming surgery regret the decision.

Psychological and social consequences 

A 2009 review in the International Journal of Transgenderism found that from 1998 onward, studies have shown that "the whole process of gender reassignment is effective in relieving gender dysphoria and that its positive results greatly outweighed any negative consequences", but noted methodological issues in many studies, particularly older ones. A 2010 meta-analysis in Clinical Endocrinology noted the lack of randomization and control groups and reliance of self-reporting in the studies it reviewed, reaching the conclusion "Very low quality evidence suggests that hormonal therapies given to individuals with GID as a part of sex reassignment are likely to improve gender dysphoria, psychological functioning and comorbidities, sexual function and overall quality of life."

Smith et al. (2001) found that among 20 patients, anxiety, depression and hostility levels were lower after sex reassignment surgery. Wierckx et al. (2011), in a study of 49 trans men, found them in good self-perceived physical and mental health. Dhejne et al. (2011), in a study following 324 transgender people who received sex reassignment surgery from 1973 to 2003, found that they "have considerably higher risks for mortality, suicidal behaviour, and psychiatric morbidity than the general population", concluding that "sex reassignment, although alleviating gender dysphoria, may not suffice as treatment for transsexualism". Lawrence (2003), in a study of 232 trans women who underwent surgery between 1994 and 2000, found "None reported outright regret and only a few expressed even occasional regret."

Risk categories for post-operative regret include being older, having characterised personality disorders with personal and social instability, lacking family support, lacking sexual activity, and expressing dissatisfaction with the results of surgery. During the process of sex reassignment surgery, transsexuals may become victims of different social obstacles such as discrimination, prejudice and stigmatising behaviours. The rejection faced by transgender people is much more severe than what is experienced by lesbian, gay, and bisexual individuals. The hostile environment may trigger or worsen internalized transphobia, depression, anxiety and post-traumatic stress.

Many patients perceive the outcome of the surgery as not only medically but also psychologically important. Social support can help them to relate to their minority identity, ascertain their trans identity and reduce minority stress.

Sexuality 

Looking specifically at transsexual people's genital sensitivities, both trans men and trans women are capable of maintaining their genital sensitivities after SRS. However, these are counted upon the procedures and surgical tricks which are used to preserve the sensitivity. Considering the importance of genital sensitivity in helping transsexual individuals to avoid unnecessary harm or injuries to the genitals, allowing trans men to obtain an erection by inserting a penile implant after phalloplasty, the ability for transsexual people to experience erogenous and tactile sensitivity in their reconstructed genitals is one of the essential objectives surgeons want to achieve in SRS. Moreover, studies have also found that the critical procedure for genital sensitivity maintenance and achieving orgasms after phalloplasty is to preserve both the clitoris hood and the clitoris underneath the reconstructed phallus.

Erogenous sensitivity is measured by the capabilities to reach orgasms in genital sexual activities, like masturbation and intercourse. Many studies reviewed that both trans men and trans women have reported an increase of orgasms in both sexual activities, implying the possibilities to maintain or even enhance genital sensitivity after SRS.

The majority of the transsexual individuals have reported enjoying better sex lives and improved sexual satisfaction after sex reassignment surgery. The enhancement of sexual satisfaction was positively related to the satisfaction of new primary sex characteristics. Before undergoing SRS, transsexual patients possessed unwanted sex organs which they were eager to remove. Hence, they were not enthusiastic about engaging in sexual activity. Transsexual individuals who have undergone SRS are more satisfied with their bodies and experienced less stress when participating in sexual activity.

Most of the individuals have reported that they have experienced sexual excitement during sexual activity, including masturbation. The ability to obtain orgasms is positively associated with sexual satisfaction. Frequency and intensity of orgasms are substantially different among trans men and trans women. Almost all female-to-male individuals have revealed an increase in sexual excitement and are capable of achieving orgasms through sexual activity with a partner or via masturbation, whereas only 85% of the male-to-female individuals are able to achieve orgasms after SRS. A study found that both trans men and trans women reported qualitative change in their experience of orgasm. The female-to-male transgender individuals reported that they had been experiencing intensified and stronger excitements and orgasm while male-to-female individuals have been encountering longer and more gentle feelings.

The rates of masturbation have also changed after sex reassignment surgery for both trans women and trans men. A study reported an overall increase of masturbation frequencies exhibited in most transsexual individuals and 78% of them were able to reach orgasm by masturbation after SRS. A study showed that there were differences in masturbation frequencies between trans men and trans women, in which female-to-male individuals masturbated more often than male to female The possible reasons for the differences in masturbation frequency could be associated with the surge of libido, which was caused by the testosterone therapies, or the withdrawal of gender dysphoria.

Concerning trans people's expectations for different aspects of their life, the sexual aspects have the lowest level of satisfaction among all other elements (physical, emotional and social levels). When comparing transgender with cisgender individuals of the same gender, trans women had a similar sexual satisfaction to cis women, but trans men had a lower level of sexual satisfaction to cis men. Moreover, trans men also had a lower sexual satisfaction with their sexual life than trans women.

By country

Africa 

Democratic Republic of the Congo: Though it is not illegal to be transgender, there are no protective rights or supportive legislations for legal gender change or any type of medical transitional procedures.

Egypt: There are no laws against being transgender or gender diverse, however there are many cases of de facto criminalisation under activities associated to sexwork, debauchery, public indecency, and public order provisions, and so on, as it is often considered "perverse". Furthermore, sex reassignment procedures are not legal and medical professionals are actively prohibited to perform them by the government.

Ethiopia: Medical procedures for trans people in Ethiopia are illegal. Gender expression out of the ‘norm’ faces major issues in violence and social stigmatisation.

Morocco: Casablanca, Morocco, is notable for being the home of Clinique de Parc, Georges Burou's clinic for transgender women. Burou is considered one of the pioneers of SRS. A French gynecologist, Burou created the anteriorly pedicled penile skin flap inversion vaginoplasty, still considered the "gold standard" of skin-lined vaginoplasty. He is credited with having performed over 3000 MtF surgeries.

Nigeria: Medical procedures such as hormone replacement and sex reassignment are illegal. Additionally, it is not possible to change one's name or gender marker in the country of Nigeria, and trans individuals in Nigeria are not legally protected for gender expression.

South Africa: Trans and gender diverse peoples are protected and acknowledged under South African Law, where no sterilisation or other forced procedures are necessary to have legal recognition of a person's gender identity. Sex reassignment surgery is legal and accessible, but not covered by medical aid.

Asia 

China: Gender-affirming surgeries and changing one’s legal name and gender are all accessible in the Peoples’ Republic of China, but there are rigorous steps to follow to do so. To change one’s legal gender, they must show a gender determination certificate as proof of sex reassignment surgery, which cannot be undergone without: psychiatric diagnosis, verification of no prior criminal record, proof that the family has been notified, written agreement from their family and work unit, that they are unmarried and over 20 years old. Psychiatric
diagnosis is not given to someone who is not exclusively heterosexual.

India: Transgender people in India need to undergo sex reassignment surgery to change their legal gender from male to female or vice-versa. This has been opposed by Indian transgender activists. India also requires proof of sex reassignment surgery for changing the gender listed on one's passport. This requirement has been challenged in courts. The government's flagship national health insurance scheme may soon cover sex reassignment surgeries for transgender individuals. India is offering affordable sex reassignment surgery to a growing number of medical tourists and to the general population.

Iran: The Iranian government's response to homosexuality is to endorse, and fully pay for, sex reassignment surgery. The leader of Iran's Islamic Revolution, Ayatollah Ruhollah Khomeini, issued a fatwa declaring sex reassignment surgery permissible for "diagnosed transsexuals". Eshaghian's documentary, Be Like Others, chronicles a number of stories of Iranian gay men who feel transitioning is the only way to avoid further persecution, jail, or execution. The head of Iran's main transsexual organization, Maryam Khatoon Molkara, who convinced Khomeini to issue the fatwa on transsexuality, confirmed that some people who undergo operations are gay rather than transsexual. According to the research study of Zara Saeidzadeh who questioned fourteen trans men, nine had completed their medical transition and the remaining five had the intention of completing their medical transition.

Japan: , Japan requires the forced sterilization of transgender people for the legal recognition of sex reassignment.

Singapore: The first sex reassignment surgery in Singapore was successfully performed on 30 July 1971. Singapore was the first country in Asia to legalize same sex reassignment surgeries in 1973. Singapore's first sex reassignment operation on a female-to-male patient took place three years later, and was carried out in three stages between August 1974 and October 1977, as female-to-male conversions are much more complex. Medical tourism for such surgeries are also prelevant in Singapore as local hospitals also accepts foreigners. In 1996, the Singaporean government legalized marriage for transsexuals.

Pakistan: In Pakistan, the Council of Islamic Ideology has ruled that SRS contravenes Islamic law as construed by the council.

Thailand: Thailand is the country that performs the most sex reassignment surgeries, followed by Iran.

Indonesia: In Indonesia, it has been possible to do sex reassignment surgery since 1973 when Vivian Rubianti was the first transgender woman to have legal gender changes in the country. Indonesia requires SRS and judicial approval for a person to legally change gender. Then, the gender/sex change of that transgender individual will be recognized by the state as the opposite legal gender.

United Arab Emirates: sex reassignment surgery is illegal in UAE.

Europe 

France: Since 2016, France no longer requires SRS as a condition for a gender change on legal documents. In 2017, a case brought earlier by three transgender French people was decided. France was found in violation of the European Convention on Human Rights for requiring the forced sterilization of transgender people seeking to change their gender on legal documents.

Malta: As late as 2010, transgender people that have undergone SRS can change their sex on legal documents.

Romania: Sex reassignment surgery is legal and its costs are fully covered by health insurance. Undergoing it is required for a person to change their sex on legal documents.

Russia: Psychiatric evaluation is necessary to receive a diagnosis of ‘transsexualism’ before one can be authorized for hormone therapy or gender reassignment surgeries. And all expenses regarding hormone treatment or surgeries are not covered by government aid and must be paid by the patient.

Spain: Despite a resolution from the European Parliament in 1989 suggesting advanced rights for all European Union citizens, as of 2002 only Andalusia's public health system covers sex reassignment surgery.

Switzerland: In 2010, the Swiss Federal Supreme Court struck down two laws that limited access to SRS. These included requirements of at least 2 years of psychotherapy before health insurance was obligated to cover the cost of SRS and inability to procreate.

Ukraine: In 2015, the Administrative District Court of Kyiv ruled that forced sterilization was unlawful and no longer required for legal gender change.

United Kingdom: The minimum age for sex reassignment surgery varies from 16 in Scotland to 18 in Wales. It is not a requirement for legal gender change.

North America 

Canada: As of 1 July 2017, all Canadian provinces and territories allow a change of sex on birth certificates without SRS requirements.

Cuba: On 4 June 2008, MINSAP, the Cuban Ministry of Public Health, issued Resolution 126 – an act that assured complete coverage for Cubans seeking sexual reassignment surgeries, the first of any country in Latin America to do so. Consisting of 11 articles, article 5 of the resolution explains that it is the responsibility of the national commission to provide comprehensive health care to "all transsexual citizens." This includes diagnosis, psychological and psychiatric care, the provision of necessary medications, therapy, and reassignment surgery. Prior to being approved, it was suggested that the bill would make Cuba the most progressive nation in Latin America on gender issues. The resolution was heavily pushed for by CENESEX a government-funded body dedicated to advocating LGBT rights and "sexual diversity".

Guatemala: Guatemala has no comprehensive civil law that explicitly protects against discrimination
or addresses hate crimes on the basis of sexual orientation or gender identity. Nor is it possible to legally change one's gender.

Haiti: Sex reassignment surgery does not exist in Haiti and it is not possible to change one's name or gender marker legally.

Mexico: As of a 2014 law, Mexico City no longer requires SRS for changes of sex on birth certificates, and several states have followed suit.

United States of America: Before the legalization of same-sex marriage in the United States, there were several Supreme Court cases that did not legally recognize individuals who underwent SRS by invalidating marriages of trans people. Today, many states require SRS as a prerequisite for recognition of a legal sex change on official documents such as passports, birth certificates, or IDs. Alabama and Arkansas passed laws in 2022 and 2021, respectively, that prohibit gender-affirming surgery for minors. Plaintiffs have challenged the legislation in Alabama, and a May 2022 federal court injunction blocked enforcement of the law while litigation is pending. Implementation has been challenged in state, and then federal court also in Arkansas, delaying implementation, as of January 2023.

South America 
Argentina: In 2012, Argentina began offering government subsidized total or partial SRS to all persons 18 years of age or older. Private insurance companies are prohibited from increasing the cost of SRS for their clients. At the same time, the Argentinian government repealed a law that banned SRS without authorization from a judge. Furthermore, it is not required to undergo SRS to change sex on legal documents.

Brazil: As of March 2018, the Supreme Court unanimously removed medical and
judicial criteria for all trans persons to change their names and legal gender. Trans people in Brazil can receive government funded sex reassignment surgery at the minimum age of 18, and hormone replacement therapy at the age of 16.

Chile: In 2012, a bill was introduced that stated SRS was no longer a requirement for legal name and sex change. In 2013, Chile's public health plan was required to cover sex reassignment surgery. The cost is subsidized by the government based on a patient's income.

Colombia: Binary-transgender changes are recognised in Colombia but there has only been 1 case of legal change to a non-binary marker. Gender marking changes are granted often only when a medical precondition is met, including, but not limited to, psychiatric diagnosis or sterilisation. Sex reassignment surgery is not always necessary for gender change but it is still available under Colombian insurance or if paid out of pocket.

Peru: It is possible to change both one's gender marker and name legally. Although sex reassignment surgeries are available, trans Peruvians often face barriers to gender-affirming care (e.g., lack of qualified and willing providers, high cost, restrictive gatekeeping in assessment for hormones and surgery), and trans individuals may face malpractice and various forms discrimination.

Uruguay: The Comprehensive Law for Trans People, which was passed on 19 October 2018, improves the access of surgeries for transgender people, which says that the state will pay for them. For those under 18 wishing to undergo surgery, a request to change their legal name and sex must accompany their registration. For minors who do not have consent from guardians, judicial authorization may be sought in its place.

See also

References

External links 

Gender transitioning and medicine
Surgical procedures and techniques